Roberto Molina Barreto (born November 8, 1955) is a Guatemalan lawyer and politician, who served as Attorney General of the Nation from 2005 to 2006, magistrate of the Constitutional Court from 2006 to 2016 and President of the Constitutional Court on two occasions.

On December 2, 2018, he was proclaimed candidate for vice president by Valor along with Zury Ríos –daughter of Efraín Ríos Montt– as candidate for president.

References

1955 births
Living people
People from Guatemala City
Guatemalan politicians